Leonel Navarrete Arciga (born 23 July 1996 in Zamora, Michoacán) is a Mexican professional footballer who plays as a forward.

References

1996 births
Living people
Footballers from Michoacán
People from Zamora, Michoacán
Association football forwards
Club América footballers
Mexican footballers
21st-century Mexican people